Dženan Bureković (born 29 May 1995) is a Bosnian professional footballer who plays as a left-back for Serbian club Spartak Subotica on loan from the Hungarian club Újpest.

Club career
In February 2023, Bureković joined Spartak Subotica in Serbia on loan.

International career
He received a call for the Bosnia and Herzegovina U21 team for their game against Switzerland played on 30 June 2016, but stayed on the bench.

Club statistics

Updated to games played as of 27 June 2020.

References

1995 births
Sportspeople from Zenica
Living people
Association football fullbacks
Bosnia and Herzegovina footballers
Bosnia and Herzegovina youth international footballers
NK Čelik Zenica players
FK Vojvodina players
Újpest FC players
Göztepe S.K. footballers
FK Spartak Subotica players
Premier League of Bosnia and Herzegovina players
Serbian SuperLiga players
Nemzeti Bajnokság I players
Süper Lig players
Bosnia and Herzegovina expatriate footballers
Expatriate footballers in Serbia
Bosnia and Herzegovina expatriate sportspeople in Serbia
Expatriate footballers in Hungary
Bosnia and Herzegovina expatriate sportspeople in Hungary
Expatriate footballers in Turkey
Bosnia and Herzegovina expatriate sportspeople in Turkey